Prida sechellensis is a species of spiders in the family Oonopidae. It was first described in 2001 by Saaristo. , it is the sole species in the genus Prida. It is found in the Seychelles.

References

Oonopidae
Spiders of Africa
Spiders described in 1979